The 2022–23 USC Upstate Spartans men's basketball team represented the University of South Carolina Upstate in the 2022–23 NCAA Division I men's basketball season. The Spartans, led by fifth-year head coach Dave Dickerson, played their home games at the G. B. Hodge Center in Spartanburg, South Carolina as members of the Big South Conference.

Previous season
The Spartans finished the 2021–22 season 15–17, 10–6 in Big South play to finish in third place in the South Division. They defeated Charleston Southern in the quarterfinals of the Big South tournament, before losing to eventual champion Longwood in the semifinals. They were invited to The Basketball Classic, where they beat Appalachian State in the first round, before falling to South Alabama in the second round.

Roster

Schedule and results

|-
!colspan=12 style=| Exhibition

|-
!colspan=12 style=| Non-conference regular season

|-
!colspan=12 style=| Big South regular season

|-
!colspan=12 style=| Big South tournament
|-

|-
!colspan=12 style=| College Basketball Invitational

|-

Sources

References

USC Upstate Spartans men's basketball seasons
USC Upstate
USC Upstate
USC Upstate Spartans men's basketball
USC Upstate Spartans men's basketball